E (E-flat) or mi bémol is the fourth semitone of the solfège.

It lies a diatonic semitone above D and a chromatic semitone below E, thus being enharmonic to D (D-sharp) or re dièse. In equal temperament it is also enharmonic with F (F-double flat). However, in some temperaments, D is not the same as E.  E is a perfect fourth above B, whereas D is a major third above B.

When calculated in equal temperament with a reference of A above middle C as 440 Hz, the frequency of the E above middle C (or E4) is approximately 311.127 Hz. See pitch (music) for a discussion of historical variations in frequency.

In German nomenclature, it is known as Es, sometimes (especially in the context of musical motifs, e.g. DSCH motif) abbreviated to S.

Designation by octave

Scales

Common scales beginning on E
 E major: E F G A B C D E
 E natural minor: E F G A B C D E
 E harmonic minor: E F G A B C D E
 E melodic minor ascending: E F G A B C D E
 E melodic minor descending: E D C B A G F E

Diatonic scales
 E Ionian: E F G A B C D E
 E Dorian: E F G A B C D E
 E Phrygian: E F G A B C D E
 E Lydian: E F G A B C D E
 E Mixolydian: E F G A B C D E
 E Aeolian: E F G A B C D E
 E Locrian: E F G A B C D E

Jazz melodic minor
 E ascending melodic minor: E F G A B C D E
 E Dorian ♭2: E F G A B C D E
 E Lydian augmented: E F G A B C D E
 E Lydian dominant: E F G A B C D E
 E Mixolydian ♭6: E F G A B C D E
 E Locrian ♮2: E F G A B C D E
 E altered: E F G A B C D E

See also
 Piano key frequencies
 List of E-flat instruments
 E-flat major
 E-flat minor
 Root (chord)

References

Musical notes